Coşqun Şahin oğlu Diniyev (born on 13 September 1995 in Baku, Azerbaijan) is an Azerbaijani professional footballer who plays as a midfielder for Azerbaijan Premier League side Zira.

Personal life
Diniyev's father, Şahin Diniyev, is the current manager of Kapaz, for whom his older brother Karim Diniyev also plays for Sabah FC.

Club career
Coşqun Diniyev made his professional debut in the Azerbaijan Premier League for Inter Baku on 18 November 2012 in a game against Turan-Tovuz.

On 1 June 2015, Diniyev signed a two-year contract with Qarabağ FK.

Diniyev made his debut for Qarabağ in a 2–2 away draw against Gabala on 10 August 2015.

Coşqun Diniyev made his debut for UEFA Champions League group stage game against Chelsea in Stamford Bridge on 12 September 2017.

On 13 January 2019, Diniyev signed a three-year contract with Sabah FK.

International career
Diniyev made his Azerbaijan debut on 7 June 2015 against Serbia in friendly match.

Career statistics

Club

International

Statistics accurate as of match played 9 June 2018

Honours
 Qarabağ FK
Azerbaijan Premier League (3): 2015–16, 2016–17, 2017–18
Azerbaijan Cup (1): 2015-16

International
Azerbaijan U23
 Islamic Solidarity Games: (1) 2017

References

1995 births
Living people
Association football midfielders
Azerbaijani footballers
Shamakhi FK players
Qarabağ FK players
Sabah FC (Azerbaijan) players
Azerbaijan Premier League players
Azerbaijan under-21 international footballers
Azerbaijan youth international footballers
Azerbaijan international footballers
Footballers from Baku